Wisconsin Public Radio (WPR) is a network of 34 public radio stations in the state of Wisconsin. WPR's network is divided into two distinct analog services, the Ideas Network and the NPR News & Music Network, as well as the All Classical Network, a digital-only, full-time classical music service.

History
In 1932, WHA in Madison and WLBL in Stevens Point started limited simulcasting of certain programs.  However, the first real steps toward the building of what would become Wisconsin Public Radio began in 1947, with the sign-on of WHA-FM (now WERN) as a sister station to WHA.  Between 1948 and 1965, seven more FM stations signed on as part of what was initially dubbed Wisconsin Educational Radio.  The network became Wisconsin Public Radio in 1971, when it became a charter member of National Public Radio.  Shortly afterward, the merger of the University of Wisconsin and Wisconsin State University systems into the present-day University of Wisconsin System greatly increased WPR's reach.

Ideas Network
The Ideas Network is devoted mostly to discussion and call-in shows, focusing on the state of Wisconsin and issues involving the state. The name of the network comes from the Wisconsin Idea concept associated with the UW System.

During the week, the Ideas Network airs locally produced talk programming, longtime daily reading showcase Chapter a Day, and WBUR's On Point in mid-mornings, WAMU's 1A Monday-Thursdays and National Public Radio's Science Friday in early afternoons, while at night broadcasting Q and As It Happens from CBC Radio One, along with a mix of national programs including Reveal, Latino USA and The Moth Radio Hour, as well as repeats of Chapter a Day, and overnight, the BBC World Service. In election years, expanded political coverage occurs, along with WPR often coordinating in part political debates for the state's highest offices such as Governor and Attorney General, often with PBS Wisconsin (formerly Wisconsin Public Television).

On the weekend, it airs WPR-produced shows, such as Zorba Paster On Your Health and To the Best of Our Knowledge. Weekends also include NPR/PRI/APM entertainment programming such as Wait Wait... Don't Tell Me!, Ask Me Another, Radiolab and Live from Here (the former A Prairie Home Companion) on Saturdays, with Says You!, A Way with Words, Milk Street Radio, Bullseye with Jesse Thorn, and This American Life on Sundays. Other WPR-originated programming on the weekends include: University of the Air, the folk music focused Simply Folk, and PRX Remix. Higher Ground, a program of world music hosted by Dr. Jonathan Overby, is broadcast on Saturday night on WHAD, WPR's Ideas Network station in Milwaukee, and otherwise heard on WPR's News & Classical Music stations around the state. Formerly the network carried old time radio programming on weekend evenings, but discontinued doing so in June 2020 due to the racial and sexist views of the era proving outdated and offensive to general audiences.

The flagship station of the Ideas Network is WHA 970 AM in Madison, one of the oldest existing radio stations in the world. All Ideas Network stations broadcast in analog monaural sound to provide those signals the largest coverage areas possible, while the HD Radio and Internet streaming feeds broadcast in stereo.

Personalities hosting call-in talk shows on the Ideas Network (as of November 2017) include Kate Archer Kent (early morning weekdays), Larry Meiller (late morning and early afternoon weekdays) and Central Time with Rob Ferrett and various co-hosts (afternoon drive time). On the typical weekday, the Ideas Network broadcasts over seven hours of live, Wisconsin-produced call-in talk shows.

NPR News & Music Network
The NPR News & Music Network, formerly the NPR News & Classical Network, was originally devoted to classical music, along with carrying the national NPR News programs Morning Edition and All Things Considered, though its news and talk programs have increased since the early 2000s with the public radio industry's overall shift away from all-music programming. As of 2020, it carries the syndicated Classical 24 network in non-prime hours, while daily classical programming originates from Madison.

In addition to the programs above, this network carries Fresh Air, Weekend Edition, APM's Marketplace, the BBC World Service's Newshour, and Live from Here. Live from the Met is offered during the opera's concert season. WPR also produces specialty programming on the weekend, such as a listener request program and a local music program titled Wisconsin Classical. The network also carries weekend jazz, folk and world music programming - including Higher Ground, hosted by Dr. Jonathan Overby on Saturday nights (this program is also heard on WPR's Milwaukee-based Ideas Network Station WHAD). Other forms of music such as blues, new-age, and Native American music can be heard regionally. A few Ideas Network stations in areas not served by this network carry the above programs in place of the master Ideas Network schedule. The NPR News & Music network does not have a presence in Milwaukee with most of the programming, including the flagship national news programming carried on the network instead being available on independent NPR affiliate WUWM. The news/music network is available in outer portions of Metro Milwaukee via stations in Madison and Kenosha.   

The flagship station of the NPR News & Music Network is WERN in Madison.

The All Classical Network and other digital services
The All Classical Network service is available as an online stream and through HD Radio in select markets. The All Classical Network exclusively features classical music. The network includes a simulcast of locally produced daytime classical programming, Exploring Music with Bill McGlaughlin, and syndicated Classical 24 programming.  Stations with this HD-2 service include WERN Madison, WHAD Milwaukee, WHRM Wausau, WPNE Green Bay, WHHI Highland, and WHLA La Crosse.  It was also available on analog translator W272CN 102.3FM in Ashland, rebroadcasting WHSA HD-2. W272CN, originally W275AF/102.9, was no longer needed after WPR constructed two full-power stations in the Chequamegon Bay area and was discontinued in June 2016 . On October 19, 2020, WPR discontinued HD service on KUWS Superior, WHSA Brule-Superior, WUWS Ashland, WHBM Park Falls, WHWC Menomonie, WHAA Wisconsin Rapids, and WHDI Sister Bay, due to low listenership. 

The All Classical Network streams real-time live over most Internet streaming venues, along with WPR's mobile app and website. Downloadable versions of WPR shows in MP3 are available, but are restricted to certain downloading guidelines and timeframes.

A few stations broadcast an HD-3 service within the network.  WHRM airs the Ideas Network on HD-3 to serve the Wausau area, due to WLBL-FM being a time-share operation with Rhinelander's WXPR as WXPW (as of September 2017, WLBL-HD3 is rebroadcast full-time in the Wausau area via analog translator W267BB (101.3)).  WHHI airs the News/Classical Network on HD-3 to fill in coverage gaps of WERN and WSSW.  WHLA airs News/Classical on HD-3 to fill in coverage gaps of WLSU. WERN also has an HD-3, which is the audio of Ideas Network station WHA to feed translator W215AQ 90.9 in Madison.

WPR affiliate station WGTD HD-2 offers a 24/7 jazz, big band and blues service, and WGTD HD-3 provides a reading service for the blind and visually impaired.

Network stations
WPR's stations are licensed to several different organizations; most stations belong to either the University of Wisconsin System and are administered by the University of Wisconsin–Extension, or to the Wisconsin Educational Communications Board, a state agency. Other stations are affiliates, owned by local schools or colleges.

The network's headquarters are located on the Madison campus where the majority of programs are produced. Some of WPR's regional studios produce local programming. Not all UW-owned stations are part of Wisconsin Public Radio's network; some are student-run, and others, like WUWM, are part of the UW-system, but not part of WPR. Two high school radio stations (one, WEPS, is located in the northwest Chicago suburb of Elgin, and its signal does not reach the Wisconsin state line) carry the network outside of school hours and summer periods, providing a form of license protection to those stations (WEPS began to program the Ideas Network in order to fend off a license challenge due to being off-air after school hours), while WLBL-FM in Wausau shares time on its frequency with WXPW, a repeater of independently owned NPR member WXPR in Rhinelander.

Ethics and community guidelines
Wisconsin Public Radio states that it "is committed to the highest standards of journalistic ethics and excellence" on its website and that it ascribes to the RTDNA Code of Ethics and Professional Conduct.

Listeners and the broader public are invited to share their views of programs, topics and guests during radio broadcasts, on social media and wpr.org web forums and through WPR's Audience Services phone and email contacts.  WPR posts guidelines for talk-show callers and online community members on its website. The guidelines are enforced through call-screeners during broadcast programs and online forums are regularly monitored by WPR staff.

Wisconsin Public Radio shows with national distribution

Current
To the Best of Our Knowledge
Zorba Paster On Your Health

Former
Michael Feldman's Whad'Ya Know?

See also 
 National Public Radio
 PBS Wisconsin
 Public Radio International
 Wisconsin Educational Communications Board
 Wisconsin Idea

References

External links 
 Wisconsin Public Radio
 Wisconsin Public Radio Association

 

Public broadcasting in Wisconsin
American radio networks
NPR member networks
Peabody Award winners
Radio stations established in 1948
1948 establishments in Wisconsin